Sucat is an administrative division in southern Metro Manila, the Philippines. It is an urban barangay in Muntinlupa City with many high-rise condominiums and commercial establishments in the area. The area is also well known for the Sucat exit of the South Luzon Expressway and Metro Manila Skyway.

It is bounded on the north by Barangays Bagumbayan and South Daang Hari of Taguig; on the south by the Sucat River and Barangays Buli and Cupang; on the west by Barangays San Martin de Porres, Marcelo Green, San Antonio, and BF Homes of Parañaque; and on the east by Laguna de Bay.

Etymology
The name of the barangay, Sucat comes from the Malay and Filipino vernacular word sukat which means “measurement”. Historically, the community was measured several times by the Posadas family when Don Juan Posadas, who at that time had a very close association with the Spanish government officials, was the mayor of Manila. He did acquire all the land that he wanted to measure.

Subdivisions
While barangays are the administrative divisions of the city, and are legally part of the addresses of establishments and homes, residents also include their subdivision. Listed below are subdivisions in this barangay.

 Augusto Posadas Village
 Lakefront (La Posada, Marina Heights, Presidio and The Marfori)
 Corinthian Villas
 Don Juan Bayview Subdivision
 Dona Rosario Heights Subdivision
 Dona Rosario Bayview
 Patio Homes

Demographics
Barangay Sucat is the fifth most-populated barangay in Muntinlupa, with a population of 56,354 people according to the 2020 census, down from a population of 57,504 in the 2015 census.

See also
 Sucat People's Park
 Sucat Thermal Power Plant
 Sucat railway station

References

Muntinlupa
Barangays of Metro Manila